Edith Georgette Clark (also known as Edith Boiteux, 15 June 1904 – 16 March 1937) was a French aviator and parachutist.

Biography 
Clark was born in Cuffy, in the Cher region of France, on 15 June 1904. She worked as a typist and became interested in aviation; however, she could not afford the expenses of flying lessons on her salary. Instead, she started parachuting and earned money testing different types of military parachutes.

In 1926, Clark joined a Freemasons Lodge in Paris, and became the secretary of the lodge.

In 1936, when the French parachutist permit had just been created, Clark was the first woman to obtain it from the Ministry of Air, which allowed her to officially become a professional parachutist.

Clark died in a parachuting accident on 16 March 1937 at the Avignon-Pujaut Military Training Center in Avignon. Despite the belated attempt to open her reserve parachute, she crashed to the ground and died on impact. It was her 200th parachute jump.

Clark's funeral was held in Paris, at the Sainte-Geneviève des Grandes-Carrières church, and she was initially buried in Meaux; however, her remains were later transferred to Nevers. The Ministry of Air gave Clark a posthumous citation recognising her bravery for the Ordre de la nation (Order of the Nation).

References

1904 births
1937 deaths
French Freemasons
Aviation pioneers
Aviators killed in aviation accidents or incidents in France
French aviators
French women aviators
French skydivers
Parachuting deaths
Victims of aviation accidents or incidents in 1937
20th-century French women